Dicauda is a genus of cnidarians belonging to the family Myxobolidae.

Species:
 Dicauda atherinodi Hoffman & Walker, 1978

References

Cnidarian genera
Myxobolidae